Tafua-upolu is an active cinder cone in the Aʻana district of the island of Upolu in Samoa. The name tafua is derived from the Tongan tofua (fire-mountain or volcano). Radiocarbon dating suggests it last erupted between 1300 and 1395 CE.

References

Mountains of Samoa
Volcanoes of Samoa
Cinder cones
A'ana